Otto Scherzer  (9 March 1909 – 15 November 1982) was a German theoretical physicist who made contributions to electron microscopy.

Education
Scherzer studied physics at the Munich Technical University and the Ludwig Maximilians University of Munich (LMU) from 1927 to 1931.  At LMU his thesis advisor was Arnold Sommerfeld, and he was granted his doctorate in 1931.  His thesis was on the quantum theory of Bremsstrahlung. From 1932 to 1933, Scherzer was an assistant to Carl Ramsauer at the Allgemeine Elektrizitäts-Gesellschaft,  an electric combine with headquarters in Berlin and Frankfurt-on-Main.  There, he did research on electron optics.  He completed his Habilitation in 1934, and he then became a Privatdozent at LMU and an assistant to Sommerfeld.

Career

In 1935, Scherzer moved to the Technische Hochschule Darmstadt  In 1936, he became an extraordinarius professor and director of the theoretical physics department. In a landmark 1936 paper, Scherzer proved that the spherical and chromatic aberrations of a rotationally symmetric, static, space-charge-free, dioptric lens for electron beams cannot be eliminated by skillful design, in contrast to the case for glass lenses. This was later called Scherzer's theorem and is the only named and well-established theorem in the field of charged particle optics. In 1947, Scherzer published a sequel to this paper proposing various corrected lenses, dependent upon abandoning one or other requirements as set forth in the 1936 paper.  Scherzer’s derivations contributed to the development of electron microscopy.

From 1939 to 1945, Scherzer worked on radar at the communications research headquarters of the German Navy (Nachrichtenmittel-Versuchskommando der Kriegsmarine). In a communication with Sommerfeld, dated 2 December 1944, Scherzer reported war damage in Darmstadt and commented on his work on radar.  From 1944 to 1945, Scherzer was head of radar finding research (Arbeitsbereich Funkmesstechnik) for the Reich Research Council (Reichsforschungsrat), which was the coordinating agency in the Reich Education Ministry (Reichsziehungsministerium) for the centralized planning of basic and applied research.

In 1954, Scherzer became ordinarius professor at the Technische Hochschule Darmstadt, where he helped found the Society for Heavy Ion Research.  A literature citation places Scherzer at Darmstadt as late as 1978. Scherzer died in Darmstadt.

Awards

1983 – Microscopy Society of America, Distinguished Scientist Award, Physical Sciences

Selected bibliography

 - English translation published as 
O. Scherzer, Sphärische und chromatische Korrektur von Elektronenlinsen, Optik 2 114–132 (1947) as cited in Peter Hawkes - Recent Advances in Electron Optics and Electron Microscopy.
O. Scherzer (Signal Corps Engineering Laboratories, Fort Monmouth, New Jersey) The Theoretical Resolution Limit of the Electron Microscope, Journal of Applied Physics Volume 20, Issue 1, pp. 20–29 (1948). Received June 14, 1948.
O. Scherzer, "Limitations for the resolving power of electron microscopes", Proceedings ICEM-9 Volume 3, 123–9 (1978) as cited in  Peter Hawkes -  The Long Road to Spherical Aberration Correction.

Books
E. Brüche and O. Scherzer Geometrische Elektronenoptik:  Grundlagen und Anwendungen (Springer, 1934)

Notes

References

 Klaus Hentschel (editor) and Ann M. Hentschel, (editorial assistant and translator), Physics and National Socialism: An Anthology of Primary Sources (Birkhäuser, 1996)

1909 births
1982 deaths
People from Passau
20th-century German physicists
Technical University of Munich alumni
Microscopy